Richardson Independent School District (RISD) is a school district based in Richardson, Texas (USA).

RISD operates 55 campuses that serve more than 39,000 students.

In 2011, the school district was rated "recognized" by the Texas Education Agency.

A majority of RISD is located in Dallas. Two portions of North Dallas are in Richardson ISD: One is north of Interstate 635, between Coit Road and Preston Road, and south of the Collin-Dallas county line; the other is the portion of Lake Highlands east of White Rock Creek and north of the Northwest Highway. These areas, annexed into the City of Dallas after 1960, are generally high income.

History
The district was founded in 1854.  At the time it provided education for children of local farmers, small business owners and settlers around the railroad just outside Dallas, TX.  In recent times RISD has been rated as "Recognized" by the Texas Education Agency for many years in a row.  RISD is the largest, most racially and socioeconomically diverse district in Texas to receive a rating this high.  In 2010 the Texas Business and Education Coalition (TBEC) added 22 RISD schools to the TBEC Honor Roll.  RISD and Houston ISD leads the state in schools named to the Honor Roll.  Only 252 public schools out of 8,000 in Texas were named to the TBEC Honor Roll, placing those 22 RISD schools in the top 4% of Texas public schools.

In 2007 a report stated that, due to new development and older residents, certain areas of RISD faced student decreases. The removal of some low income apartment complexes contributed to the losses.

In 2021 Richardson ISD implemented a mask mandate during the COVID-19 pandemic in Texas and kept it in place even when the Texas Supreme Court upheld Governor of Texas Greg Abbott's ban on mask mandates.

Demographics
In 1997, over 50% of the students were non-Hispanic white. In a period until 2009, Richardson ISD's student body transitioned from a mostly white and affluent student body to a racially and socioeconomically diverse student body. In 2009 the State of Texas defined "college readiness," or readiness to undergo university studies, of high school graduates by scores on the ACT and SAT and in the 11th grade Texas Assessment of Knowledge and Skills (TAKS) tests. During that year the district's high schools consistently had high college readiness rates. Holly K. Hacker of The Dallas Morning News said that "Richardson school district leaders credit the strong showing at their high schools to attitude -- a refusal to accept poor performance based on changing demographics." From 1997 to 2016 the number of non-Hispanic white students had declined by 44%, the least severe decline of the four major suburban Dallas County school districts that were majority white in 1997.

From 1997 to 2016 the number of students on free or reduced lunches, a way of determining low income status, increased by 131%, the least severe increase of those four districts.

Secondary schools

High schools

Lloyd V. Berkner High School (Richardson)
1988-89 National Blue Ribbon School
Lake Highlands High School (Dallas)
2001-02 National Blue Ribbon School
J.J. Pearce High School (Richardson)
1988-1989 National Blue Ribbon School
Richardson High School (Richardson)
1983-84 National Blue Ribbon School
Christa McAuliffe Learning Center (Richardson)

Junior high schools 
Apollo Junior High School (Richardson)
Forest Meadow Junior High School (Dallas)
1994-96 National Blue Ribbon School
Lake Highlands Junior High School (Dallas)
2010-11 National Blue Ribbon School
Liberty Junior High School (Dallas)
Parkhill Junior High School (Dallas)
1992-93 National Blue Ribbon School
Richardson North Junior High School (Richardson)
Richardson West Junior High School (Richardson)
Westwood Junior High School (Dallas)
2011 National Blue Ribbon School

Primary schools 
Aikin Elementary School (Dallas)
Arapaho Classical Magnet School (Richardson)
Audelia Creek Elementary School (Dallas)
Big Springs Elementary School (Garland)
1987-88 and 2008 National Blue Ribbon School
Bowie Elementary School (Dallas)
 2000-2001 National Blue Ribbon School
Brentfield Elementary School (Dallas)
1993-94 National Blue Ribbon School
Carolyn G. Bukhair Elementary School (Dallas)
Canyon Creek Elementary School (Richardson)
2005 National Blue Ribbon School
Dartmouth Elementary School (Richardson)
1989-90 National Blue Ribbon School
Dobie Primary School (Dallas)
Dover Elementary School (Richardson)
Forest Lane Academy (Dallas)
Forestridge Elementary School (Dallas)
Greenwood Hills Elementary School (Richardson)
Hamilton Park Pacesetter Magnet (Dallas)
1985-86 National Blue Ribbon School
Jess Harben Elementary School (Richardson)
Lake Highlands Elementary School (Dallas)
Mark Twain Elementary School (Richardson)
Math/Science/Technology Magnet School (Richardson)
Merriman Park Elementary School (Dallas)
1989-90 National Blue Ribbon School
Mohawk Elementary School (Richardson)
2005 National Blue Ribbon School
Moss Haven Elementary School (Dallas)
1993-94 National Blue Ribbon School
Northlake Elementary School (Dallas)
As of 2016 the student body is 86% low income, and the upper-middle-class neighborhoods in its attendance zone, as of 2016, largely do not send their kids to the school, instead prompting for private schools and other RISD elementary schools. Area parent Ben Solomon started a campaign to attract middle-class families back to Northlake elementary.
Northrich Elementary School
Northwood Hills Elementary School (Dallas)
O. Henry Elementary School (Garland)
Prairie Creek Elementary School (Richardson)
2003 National Blue Ribbon School
Prestonwood Elementary School (Dallas)
1996-97 National Blue Ribbon School
Richardson Heights Elementary School (Richardson)
Richardson Terrace Elementary School (Richardson)
Richland Elementary School (Richardson)
RISD Academy (Dallas)
Skyview Elementary School (Dallas)
Spring Creek Elementary School (Dallas)
Spring Valley Elementary School (Dallas)
Springridge Elementary School (Richardson)
Stults Road Elementary School (Dallas)
Thurgood Marshall Elementary School (Dallas)
Wallace Elementary School (Dallas)
As of 2016 about 25% of the students are Burmese refugees living in area apartment complexes. In the period 2006-2016 60% of the students were low income. The school's increased enrollment mostly came from the Burmese, although affluent White students also increased in number.
The Burmese students began arriving around 2010. Many of the Burmese students originated from refugee camps in Thailand. In 2010 there were 30 Burmese students, and the school hired a part-time liaison, a refugee named Juna Paw, to assist them. In 2011 a larger group of refugees moved from another apartment complex into one in the Richardson ISD district and the Wallace Elementary attendance boundary. The students spoke Chin, Karen, and Karenni. In the fall of 2011 there were 96 Burmese students at Wallace Elementary, making up around 16% of the student population. The increase meant that Paw became a full-time employee, an additional English as a second language instructor was hired, and that additional morning tutoring was established for the Burmese. The teachers at Wallace began cooperating with area churches, which held summer tutoring. By 2013 20% of the school's students were Burmese. By 2016 about 200 of the students, almost 25% of the student body, were Burmese.
White Rock Elementary School (Dallas)
White Rock Elementary originally was a mostly-White school that its employees described, in the words of Laura Miller, then working for D Magazine, as the "Norman Rockwell of neighborhood schools". By 1990 the addition of children living in apartments to the school caused the demographics to become more heavily minority and poor. In 1989 the school had 500 students. That year the number of ethnic minority students rose from 25 to 130. Due to the Fair Housing Act of 1988 apartments could no longer deny families with children as tenants. However its student body was still more affluent than those of surrounding schools.
The construction of Lake Highlands Town Center on the site of demolished apartments meant that the number of low income and minority students declined and the test scores improved: in the 2005-2006 school year, there were 270 low income students, making up 44% of the student body, and there were 205 black students, and 110 Hispanic students; 87% of the students passed Texas standardized tests, and 24% were ranked as "commended" on these tests. There were 620 total students in 2006. The student body immediately declined after the demolition of the apartments. In 2009-2010 the school had 96 low income students, making up 17% of the student body, and there were 68 Hispanic students and 68 black students; 97% of students passed state tests, the highest percentage of any RISD school, and 57% reached commended. The number of high income white students increased significantly after the apartments were demolished.
By the late aughts the popularity of the school caused it to be overcrowded with students, starting a political issue on whether to build a new school. There were 630 students by 2012, and then around 2014 there were 800 students. RISD had added classrooms that year, giving the school a capacity of 912, but the district projected that in 2017 the school would need to have portable classrooms as there still would be too many students. Eric Nicholson of D Magazine wrote "Whether White Rock Elementary actually got better at educating students is a trickier question" since on one hand having too high poverty levels in any school can damage student performance, but also that the "strongest single predictor of student achievement" is socioeconomic status; however he added that the area real estate market perceived White Rock as having improved, and therefore house values rose.
White Rock Trail Elementary School (Dallas)
 Planning to open in August 2018
Yale Elementary School (Richardson)
2006 National Blue Ribbon School

Former schools

Former secondary schools 

Northwood Junior High School (Closed in 1988; now houses RISD Academy)
Richardson Junior High School (Closed in 2007; now houses Math/Science/Technology Magnet Elementary School)

See also 

List of school districts in Texas
KRET-TV (station owned by the Richardson ISD from 1960 to 1970)
Diane Patrick, member of the Texas House of Representatives from Arlington and former teacher in the Richardson district

External links 

Richardson ISD facebook page
Richardson ISD Twitter page
Richardson ISD Youtube Channel

References

School districts in Dallas County, Texas
School districts in Dallas
Richardson, Texas